Sei may refer to:

 the plural of Seia gens, a minor plebeian family of equestrian rank at ancient Rome
 Seii (Ryukyu), the second king of the Okinawan kingdom of Chūza